The Women's 3m Synchronized Springboard event at the 2010 South American Games was held on March 22 at 15:00.

Medalists

Results

References
Summary

3m synchro W